The 35th Grey Cup was played on November 29, 1947, before 18,885 fans at Varsity Stadium at Toronto.

This was the last Grey Cup to be won by a team with all Canadian players.

The Toronto Argonauts defeated the Winnipeg Blue Bombers 10–9. This was the third year in a row that these two teams had met each other for the final game of the season.  The game had one of the most exciting finishes in Grey Cup history. Winnipeg had jumped out to a 9 to 0 lead but found the game tied in the last minute. Blue Bomber's all-star Bob Sandberg, who had scored his team's only touchdown, tried to fake a kick, but the ruse didn't work. Argo's star Joe Krol scored a final rouge to snatch the victory.  The Argonauts were presented with the Grey Cup, which had survived a fire that year when the Toronto Argonauts Rowing Club building had burned down.

References

External links
 
 

Grey Cup
Grey Cups hosted in Toronto
1947 in Ontario
November 1947 sports events in Canada
1940s in Toronto
Toronto Argonauts
Winnipeg Blue Bombers
Grey Cup